Leonardo Salvucci (born 5 June 1971) is an Argentine judoka. He competed in the men's extra-lightweight event at the 1992 Summer Olympics.

References

1971 births
Living people
Argentine male judoka
Olympic judoka of Argentina
Judoka at the 1992 Summer Olympics
Place of birth missing (living people)